is a 1956 black and white Japanese film directed by Nobuo Nakagawa.

Cast 
 Hibari Misora as Maruya, Tomone
 Haruhisa Kawada as Akinobu
 Senjaku Nakamura
 Chieko Naniwa as Okon
 Chikage Oogi as Akemi
 Shunji Sakai as Heihachi
 Kyu Sazanka as Fujimaru
 Eijirō Yanagi

References

External links
 https://www.imdb.com/title/tt0330531/

1956 films
Japanese romantic drama films
Films directed by Nobuo Nakagawa
Shintoho films
1950s Japanese films
Japanese black-and-white films